The George Nakashima House, Studio and Workshop is a historic artist's compound at 1847 and 1858 Aquetong Rd. in Solebury Township, Bucks County, Pennsylvania.  The compound consists of houses and studio buildings designed and built by artist George Nakashima (1905-1990), which served as family homes and as his studio space.  The studio-related buildings are open to the public for tours; the houses of the compound  continue to serve as residences of the Nakashima family.  In April 2014 it was also designated a National Historic Landmark.  The site was listed on the World Monument Fund's 2014 Endangered Sites Watchlist.

Description
The Nakashima complex is located in a rural setting south of the town of New Hope, Pennsylvania, on both sides of Aquetong Road south of Windy Bush Road in Solebury Township. The compound includes a total of eighteen buildings, seven of which are primarily residential in nature, while the others serve roles in the production and distribution of Nakashima's furniture and art. Four of the residential structures, located on the north side of Aquetong Road, form a complex Nakashima built for his daughter Mira, and are not open to the public. On the south side of the road, surrounded on three sides by studio buildings, is a residential compound consisting of the main house, a garage, heating house, and lanai. All of these buildings are in a basically International Style of architecture, infused with Japanese elements.

The main buildings of the studio are the Conoid Studio and the Arts Building.  The Conoid Building, which Nakashima built in 1960, is a distinctive rectangular single-story building with a concrete roof in the shape of a sinusoidal wave that gradually flattens toward the south. The walls are fashioned out of a variety of materials, including stone, concrete, cement blocks, and glass.  The roof form gives the building interior a large open area, with sections carved out by wood framing for kitchen, bathrooms, and an office.  The Arts Building was built by Nakashima in 1967 as a gallery space to showcase the works of Ben Shahn.  It is  stories in height, and is topped by a parabolic roof formed out of plywood and covered in asphalt shingles.  It now also displays works of Nakashima.

Eight buildings of the complex are open for tours; donations are requested.

Gallery

See also
List of National Historic Landmarks in Pennsylvania
National Register of Historic Places listings in Bucks County, Pennsylvania

References

External links

George Nakashima Woodworker
George Nakashima Studio, a Flickr photoset
George Nakashima bench on Antiques Roadshow
Meet America's Newest Historic Landmarks, PBS Newshour, April 27, 2014.

Houses on the National Register of Historic Places in Pennsylvania
Houses in Bucks County, Pennsylvania
Tourist attractions in Bucks County, Pennsylvania
International style architecture in Pennsylvania
Historic American Buildings Survey in Pennsylvania
National Historic Landmarks in Pennsylvania
National Register of Historic Places in Bucks County, Pennsylvania
Artists' studios in the United States